Telesign is a company based in Marina Del Rey California, United States providing digital identity and programmable communications APIs to prevent fraud and enable omnichannel engagement. Telesign’s risk scoring API analyzes phone number attributes acquired during the authentication process to assist companies with onboarding new customers securely and maintaining account integrity. Joe Burton is the current CEO of the company. 

History 

Founded in 2005 as a Communications Platform as a Service company by Darren Berkovitz, Ryan Disraeli and Stacy Stubblefield, the company pioneered Two-factor authentication services, a secure supplementary method of preventing illicit access to online accounts.  

Co-founders Disraeli, Stubblefield and Berkowitz were named as USC alumni entrepreneurs of the year. TeleSign was an early project of the technology incubator Curious Minds. 

As of 2014, the company had raised $49 million in funds. 

In April 2017, TeleSign announced that it is being acquired by BICS, a Belgium-based company for $230 million.

In December 2021, TeleSign announced it intends to go public via a business combination with North Atlantic Acquisition Corporation (NASDAQ: NAAC).

References 

Internet security
Companies based in Los Angeles
Companies established in 2005
2017 mergers and acquisitions